Pasho County or
Baxoi County  is a county under the administration of Chamdo Prefecture in  the Tibet Autonomous Region. The county seat is at Pema, which is also called the Pasho Town. The county population is 35,273 (1999). It contains the Pomda Monastery and Rakwa Tso lake.

Geography
The Pasho County contains the Brahmaputra–Salween water divide. The Ngajuk La pass is on the divide. To the north, Ling Chu flows north and east draning into Salween. To the south, Parlung Tsangpo flows south and west to drain into the Tsangpo River (the Tibetan section of Brahmaputra).

Climate

Transport

China National Highway 318

Maps

Notes

References

Bibliography

External links

 Pasho County, OpenStreetMap, retrieved 12 October 2022.
 Ling Chu basin, OpenStreetMap, retrieved 12 October 2022.

Counties of Tibet
Chamdo